Harry Watters (born in Huntsville, Alabama, U.S.) is a noted jazz trombonist.  He has performed across the United States with many jazz artists including Al Hirt, Pete Fountain, Shirley Jones, and many others.  He has performed as a featured trombone soloist with the United States Army Orchestra, the West Virginia Symphony Orchestra, and the Syracuse Symphony, among others.  He also appears annually at the Eastern Trombone Workshop.

Biography
Watters grew up in Alabama in a family full of musicians.  He graduated from the University of North Texas.  He has since performed across the US, and teaches the clinic “Power Practicing” to students all around the country.  He is married to Holly Watters, a violist and keyboardist who performs with the US Army Strings.  The two currently reside in Alexandria, Virginia.

Discography
S'Wonderful: The Music of George Gershwin (1997)
Brothers* (1999) Summit Records DCD-234
Brothers II* (2000) Summit Records DCD-266
The Island of Dr. Trombone (2000)  Summit Records DCD-478
Brothers III* (2003) Summit Records DCD-369
Love Songs (2005) Summit Records DCD-411
 * performed with brother  Ken Watters

External links
Harry Watters' official website
website of Harry and Ken Watters

American jazz trombonists
Male trombonists
Year of birth missing (living people)
Living people
21st-century trombonists
21st-century American male musicians
American male jazz musicians
Summit Records artists